Orders, decorations, and medals of the Socialist Federal Republic of Yugoslavia were created during the Second World War and used throughout the existence of the Socialist Federal Republic of Yugoslavia. The first decorations were created on March 15, 1943 and included the Order of the People's Hero, Order of the People's Liberation, Order of the Partisan Star, Order of the Brotherhood and Unity, Order for Bravery and Medal for Bravery. By 1960 the total number of decorations increased to 42 and consisted of 35 orders, 6 medals and 1 commemorative medal. The designers of the Yugoslav orders and medals were Antun Augustinčić and Đorđe Andrejević Kun.

The original decorations are kept at the World Intellectual Property Organization. The Yugoslav government requested that the decorations be given the status of "official sign" as opposed to other countries and states where the status of official control and warranty is reserved only for the national seal. With the dissolution of Yugoslavia the decorations stopped being awarded but continue to be protected by Article 6 of the Paris Convention for the Protection of Industrial Property.

Orders

Medals

Commemorative medal 

Instituted on 14 September 1944 for award to those actively involved in partisan or political units between 1941 and the end of WW2. At first, the Commemorative medal of the partisans of 1941 was considered to be the lowest of rank among the orders, but later lost that status to be considered outside of the before mentioned group and listed below medals.

Other Medals

See also
Orders, decorations, and medals of the Kingdom of Yugoslavia
Orders and medals of Federal Republic of Yugoslavia
 Socialist orders of merit

References

External links

 Orders and Decorations of the Socialist Federal Republic of Yugoslavia, 1945-90 by Lukasz Gaszewski, 2003
 Sammler.ru: Socialist Federal Republic of Yugoslavia
 За заслуги... Socialist Federative Republic of Yugoslavia © 2001-2003 Yuri Yashnev

 
Socialist Federal Republic of Yugoslavia
National symbols of Yugoslavia